This is a list of public holidays in the Marshall Islands.

References

External links

 
Marshall Islands